is The Brilliant Green's fourth single, released on August 26, 1998. It reached number 1 on the Oricon weekly single charts.

Track listing

1998 singles
Oricon Weekly number-one singles
The Brilliant Green songs
Songs written by Tomoko Kawase
Songs written by Shunsaku Okuda
Songs about flowers